Academic grading in Croatia is regulated by the Ministry of Science, Education and Sports.

Grading scale (numerical and descriptive)
In Croatia the following official grade scale applies to elementary school, high school and university students:

1 is a failing grade, while grades 2 through 5 are passing grades.

Many teachers use minus and plus symbols as grade modifiers. For example, "−5" denotes a grade slightly lower than "excellent", while "+4" denotes a grade slightly higher than "very good". Half-grades such as "4/5" are also used. These modifiers are unofficial and do not appear in final grade reports.

Conduct grading
Conduct is graded on a 3-point descriptive scale:
 Poor
 Good
 Exemplary

In practice, most students receive "exemplary" conduct grades. Conduct grade does not count towards the grade point average.

Grade point average
Grade point average is calculated as the arithmetic mean of all numerical grades:
1.00–1.99 Insufficient
2.00–2.49 Sufficient
2.50–3.49 Good
3.50–4.49 Very good
4.50–5.00 Excellent

Grade inflation
A significant grade inflation has been observed in primary education and, to a lesser degree, in secondary education. In the 2008/09 school year, almost 168,000 out of 365,000 elementary school students were graded "excellent" by their grade point average. Parent pressure on teachers has been identified as a major cause.

References

Sources
 Pravilnik o načinu praćenja i ocjenjivanja učenika u osnovnoj i srednjoj školi 
 Zakon o odgoju i obrazovanju u osnovnoj i srednjoj školi 
 Različiti sustavi ocjenjivanja i usporedne ljestvice 
 Neopravdan sat »ruši« uzorno vladanje 
 Inflacija petica: U osnovnim školama odlikaša je više od 50 posto 
 Inflacija petica: više od 80 posto đaka je odlično 
 Umjesto talenata, odlikaši bez znanja pune gimnazije  

Croatia
Grading
Grading